Komlói Bányász Sport Klub (handball section) is a Hungarian handball club from Komló, that plays in the  Nemzeti Bajnokság I, the top level championship in Hungary.

Crest, colours, supporters

Naming history

Kit manufacturers and Shirt sponsor
The following table shows in detail Komlói Bányász Sport Klub kit manufacturers and shirt sponsors by year:

Kits

Sports Hall information
Name: – Komló Városi Sportközpont
City: – Komló
Capacity: – 800
Address: – 7300 Komló, Eszperantó tér 1.

Management

Team

Current squad 

Squad for the 2022–23 season

Technical staff
 Head coach:  Bálint Kilvinger
 Assistant coach:  Dávid Péter Szabó
 Goalkeeping coach:  Attila Selymes
 Physiotherapist:  Krisztina Petricsevics
 Masseur:  Norbert Somlai
 Club doctor:  Dr. Zsófia Pankaczi

Transfers

Transfers for the 2022–23 season

Joining 

  Lev Szuharev (RB) from  SBS-Eger
  Dániel Csányi (LP) from  BFKA-Veszprém
  Josip Vekić (RB) from  Þór Akureyri

Leaving 

  Tomislav Radic (RB) to  CSM Oradea
  Norbert Jóga (LP) to  Gyöngyösi KK
  Szabolcs Szkokán (RW) to  Szigetszentmiklósi KSK

Previous Squads

Top Scorers

All Stars Team 1952-2022

In 2022, the Komló sports club celebrated its 100th anniversary, including the handball club. Here is the Komló team made up of the best of the last 100 years:
Goalkeeper:  Vaszilij Sevcov (1990-1999)
Right Winger:  Attila Kalocsay (1996-2000)
Right Back:  Zoltán Németh (1991-1999)
Centre Back:  László Papp (1985-2003)
Left Back:  Zoltán Keszthelyi (1982-2002)
Left Winger:  Igor Marković (2015-2020)
Pivot:  Serguei Tolstykh (1992-2003)
Best Defender:  Dávid Katzirz (2016-2020)
Best Coach:  László Skaliczki (1992-1995)

Honours

Individual awards

Domestic
Nemzeti Bajnokság I Top Scorer

Recent seasons

Seasons in Nemzeti Bajnokság I: 22
Seasons in Nemzeti Bajnokság I/B: 28
Seasons in Nemzeti Bajnokság II: 12

In European competition
Komló score listed first. As of 25 October 2018.

Participations in EHF Cup: 2x
Participations in Challenge Cup (City Cup): 1x
Participations in Cup Winners' Cup: 1x

EHF ranking

Former club members

Notable former players

 Ádám Bajorhegyi
 Norbert Bognár
 Tibor Cifra
 Tibor Dömös
 Srećko Jerković
 Attila Kalocsay (1996-2000)
 Dávid Katzirz (2016-2020)
 Zoltán Keszthelyi (1982-2002)
 Szabolcs Kékesi
 Viktor Melnyicsuk
 Zoltán Németh (1991-1999)
 László Papp (1985-2003)
 Attila Selymes
 Filip Sunajko
 Norbert Sutka
 Balázs Szögi
 Bence Szöllősi
 Gafar Hadžiomerović
 Branislav Obradović
 Emir Rahimić
 Goran Trkulja
 Tarik Vranac (2021–)
 Stanislav Nakhaenko
 Ante Granić
 Martino Kordić
 Ivan Matić
 Josip Pazin
 Antonio Pribanić
 Josip Vekić (2023-)
 Bruno-Vili Zobec
 Mohammad Sanad
 Joel Huesmann
 Igor Marković (2015-2020)
 Bogdan Petričević
 Serguei Tolstykh (1992-2003)
 Aleksandar Djurdjevic
 Savo Mešter
 Nikola Potić
 Bojan Rađenović
 Alexander Semikov
 Vaszilij Sevcov (1990-1999)

Former coaches

References

External links
 Official website 

Hungarian handball clubs
Baranya County